Gilbert Kaiser (born 20 April 1949) is a Liechtenstein sports shooter. He competed in the men's 10 metre air rifle event at the 1988 Summer Olympics.

References

1949 births
Living people
Liechtenstein male sport shooters
Olympic shooters of Liechtenstein
Shooters at the 1988 Summer Olympics
Place of birth missing (living people)